Jamie Eason (born April 10, 1976) is an American fitness model and writer. She is also a former NFL cheerleader and winner of the World's Fittest Model competition. She has been the featured subject and cover girl on many fitness and women's magazines. She is currently a full-time spokesperson for Bodybuilding.com, and is developing a line of swimwear and recently launched a supplement line with Labrada Nutrition. 
Eason is known as representing healthy fitness and femininity.

Early life
Eason was born April 10, 1976  in Houston, Texas. She also has an older brother.

Career

Education
While studying toward a degree in speech at Texas A&M University, she took a weight-training class for a kinesiology credit, igniting her interest in fitness training.

Early career
2001, after graduating from college and while working for her grandfather's roofing company, she tried-out for the new Houston Texans cheerleading squad. She was one of thirty-five contestants selected in a rigorous two-day process.

During her career as a Houston Texans cheerleader, she was diagnosed with breast cancer... forcing her to a desk job. Her inactive lifestyle and poor nutrition took an additional toll on her body.  To get in shape, she joined a local gym. She continued to work-out and improve but was dissatisfied with her results. After consulting a nutritionist, she was put on a proper diet to transform her body.

Later career
Eason was 'discovered' at a fitness competition in Austin, Texas. She received a pro card after her first fitness competition in 2006 at the Hardbody Entertainment Model Search at the Olympia.

As a spokes-model, Eason is known as "the female face" of Bodybuilding.com, the world's largest and most-visited online retailer for sports supplements and nutritional products. 
Jamie also authored several workout plans and routines followed by millions of bodybuilding enthusiasts on bodybuilding.com. She also focuses on removing the stereotype athletic women are unfeminine. Eason says she regrets some of her earlier photo-shoots showing more skin during her younger days. She continues fitness modeling, but encourages women in fitness and modeling to never show a lot of skin... saying "It's not worth it." Her training-style mostly revolves around weight-training; she says she prefers that over cardio training, so she doesn't do cardio training a lot but focuses on weight training.

Health through pregnancy id another Eason topic. In terms of losing baby weight in a healthy manner, Eason stated: "First, create a plan. Have a workout plan ready to follow, and create a routine to prepare your meals just like you will for your baby. Second, breast feed. It's the best way to burn those excess calories and it's good for the baby. Third, take regular walks or jogs, with your baby or with your partner. It's good to get fresh air; and every bit of exercise moves you toward your goal."

Personal life
Eason says she is Christian.  She was diagnosed with breast cancer at 22 years old, and at the age of 28, an injury revealed she has Spina Bifida Occulta, a minor form of the disease.  She says her two main pursuits in life are her family and Jesus Christ. Eason met Michael Middleton in church, and after a year of dating, he proposed to her on Christmas Eve through a song he wrote for her. She married Michael Middleton, a fellow workout enthusiast and Worship Leader in their church, on July 18, 2012. Eason gave birth to a son, August in 2013.  She gave birth to her second son, Beau at 40 years old in 2016.

References

External links
Jamie Eason Official Facebook page

1976 births
American cheerleaders
Female models from Texas
American exercise and fitness writers
Living people
National Football League cheerleaders
21st-century American women